Joseph Rimmer (6 January 1925 – 9 July 2011) was an English cricketer who played for first-class cricket for Derbyshire in 1949.

Rimmer was born at Langwith, Derbyshire. He began playing for the Derbyshire second XI during the 1948 season. During the 1949 season he played three first team matches when he took wickets in all the matches and as a tail ender was only out once. His debut in the County Championship was in June against Sussex, and he only lost his wicket when he was run out against New Zealand. A season when there were four powerful bowlers in the Derbyshire team gave Rimmer little chance to show his bowling credentials and he returned to the Second XI where he played in the 1950 season.

Rimmer was a right-arm medium-pace bowler and took five first-class wickets with an average of 52.80 and a best performance of 2 for 71. He was a right-handed batsman and played three innings in three first-class matches in which he made one run altogether.

References

1925 births
English cricketers
Derbyshire cricketers
2011 deaths